Al-Manshiyya is a Palestinian village in the West Bank governorate of Jenin. According to the Palestinian Central Bureau of Statistics, the village had a population of 156 inhabitants in mid-year 2006.

Footnotes

External links
Welcome To al-Manshiyya
Survey of Western Palestine, Map 8: IAA, Wikimedia commons 
Riwaq Registry of Historic Buildings in Palestine - Al-Manshiyya 

Villages in the West Bank
Jenin Governorate
Municipalities of the State of Palestine